Adrian Maxim (born September 7, 1988) is a Romanian kickboxer. He is the current DFS Lightweight Champion and the 2017 Wu Lin Feng -63 kg World Tournament Winner.

Biography and career
Adrian Maxim was born on September 7, 1988, in Oradea, Romania. He started combat sports with wrestling which he trained in for three years. At the age of 14 he started kickboxing with his trainer Oleg Mereuţă.

Maxim faced Petru Morari for the WKU European Light Welterweight title at GFC 6 on November 29, 2019. He won the fight by unanimous decision. Maxim next faced Wang Pengfei at Wu Lin Feng 2020: WLF World Cup 2019-2020 Final on January 11, 2020. He won the fight by decision.

Maxim faced Said Malek at OSS Fighters 05 on February 7, 2020. He lost the fight by split decision. Maxim faced Marian Lăpușneanu at Colosseum Tournament 19 on September 25, 2020. He lost the fight by unanimous decision, after an extra fourth round was fought.

On December 15, 2021, Maxim engaged in a 4-man tournament for the inaugural Dynamite Fighting Show featherweight title. In the semi final he defeated Serghei Zhanosiev by second-round TKO. In the final he rematched Ionut Popa and the two went to draw once again, after an extra round the judges gave Maxim winner by majority decision.

Maxim faced Amir Bislimi El-Dakkak at Colosseum Tournament 30 on April 8, 2022. He won the fight by unanimous decision.

Maxim faced Ghenadie Gîtlan at Colosseum Tournament 32 on June 3, 2022. He won the fight by unanimous decision.

Maxim faced Vladimir Filipov at Prometheus 3 on September 1, 2022. He needed just 61 seconds to stop Filipov with a left hook to the body.

Maxim faced Francesco Picca at FEA Championship: Full - Drive on December 17, 2022, in the semifinals of the FEA featherweight tournament. He was able to beat Picca by a first-round knockout, but suffered a unanimous decision loss to Dmitrii Sirbu in the finals of the one-day tournament.

Championships and awards 
Wu Lin Feng
 2017 Wu Lin Feng -63 kg World Tournament Winner
World Kickboxing and Karate Union
 2019 WKU European -65 kg Champion
Dynamite Fighting Show
 2021 DFS Lightweight Champion

Fight record

|-  style="background:#fbb;"
| 2023-02-04 || Loss|| align=left| Wei Rui || Wu Lin Feng 2023: Chinese New Year || Tangshan, China || Decision (Unanimous)  || 3 ||3:00

|-  bgcolor="#fbb"
| 2022-12-17 || Loss||align=left| Dmitrii Sirbu || FEA Championship: Full - Drive, Tournament Final || Ciorescu, Moldova || Ext. R. Decision || 4 || 3:00 
|-
! style=background:white colspan=9 |

|-  bgcolor="#CCFFCC"
| 2022-12-17 || Win ||align=left|  Francesco Picca || FEA Championship: Full - Drive, Tournament Semi Final || Ciorescu, Moldova || TKO (Punches) || 1 || 0:53 
|-

|-  bgcolor="#CCFFCC"
| 2022-09-01 || Win ||align=left| Vladimir Filipov || Prometheus 3 || Dej, Romania || KO (left hook to the body) || 1 || 1:01 
|-
|-  bgcolor="#CCFFCC"
| 2022-06-03 || Win ||align=left| Ghenadie Gîtlan || Colosseum Tournament 32 || Craiova, Romania || Decision (unanimous) || 3 || 3:00
|-
|-  style="text-align:center; background:#cfc;"
| 2022-04-08 || Win || align=left| Amir Bislimi El-Dakkak || Colosseum Tournament 30|| Malmö, Sweden || Decision (unanimous) || 3 || 3:00
|-  style="text-align:center; background:#cfc;"
| 2021-12-15 || Win || align=left| Ionuț Popa || Dynamite Fighting Show 13, Final || Bucharest, Romania || Ext.R Decision (majority) || 4 || 3:00
|-
! style=background:white colspan=9 |

|-  style="text-align:center; background:#cfc;"
| 2021-12-15 || Win || align=left| Serghei Zanosiev || Dynamite Fighting Show 13, Semi Final || Bucharest, Romania || TKO (knee) ||2 || 1:49

|-  style="text-align:center; background:#cfc;"
| 2021-09-20 || Win || align=left| Lucian Gherman || Colosseum Tournament 27 || Oradea, Romania || TKO (retirement) ||2 || 3:00

|-  style="text-align:center; background:#cfc;"
| 2021-07-22 || Win || align=left| Ionuț Popa || Prometheus 1 || Cluj-Napoca, Romania || Ext.R Decision ||4 || 3:00

|-  style="text-align:center; background:#fbb;"
| 2021-04-01|| Loss||align=left| Cristian Spetcu|| Colosseum Tournament 24 || Bucharest, Romania || Decision  || 3 || 3:00

|-  style="text-align:center; background:#cfc;"
| 2020-12-18 || Win || align=left| Silviu Ionescu || Colosseum Tournament 22 || Bucharest, Romania || Decision (Unanimous) ||3 || 3:00

|-  style="text-align:center; background:#fbb;"
| 2020-09-25 || Loss || align=left| Marian Lăpușneanu || Colosseum Tournament 19 || Hungary || Ext.R Decision (Unanimous) ||4 || 3:00

|-  style="text-align:center; background:#fbb;"
| 2020-02-07 || Loss || align=left| Said Malek || OSS Fighters 05 || Bucharest, Romania || Decision (Split) ||3 || 3:00

|-  style="text-align:center; background:#cfc;"
| 2020-01-11 ||Win  || align=left| Wang Pengfei || Wu Lin Feng 2020: WLF World Cup 2019-2020 Final|| Zhuhai, China || Decision || 3 || 3:00

|-  style="text-align:center; background:#cfc;"
| 2019-11-29 ||Win || align=left| Petru Morari || GFC 6 || Timișoara, Romania || Decision (Unanimous) || 5 || 3:00
|-
! style=background:white colspan=9 |

|-  style="text-align:center; background:#fbb;"
| 2019-10-28 ||Loss || align=left| Maxim Railean || Colosseum Tournament 16, -65 kg Tournament Final || Sibiu, Romania || TKO (retirement) || 3 || 3:00
|-
! style=background:white colspan=9 |

|-  style="text-align:center; background:#cfc;"
| 2019-10-28 ||Win || align=left| Fabrizio Conti || Colosseum Tournament 16, -65 kg Tournament Semi Final || Sibiu, Romania || Decision (Unanimous) || 3 || 3:00

|-  style="text-align:center; background:#cfc;"
| 2019-09-22 ||Win || align=left| Artom Grigoryan || Colosseum Tournament 15 || Oradea, Romania || Decision (Unanimous) || 3 || 3:00

|-  style="text-align:center; background:#fbb;"
| 2019-07-27 ||Loss || align=left| Pan Jiayun || Wu Lin Feng 2019: WLF -67kg World Cup 2019-2020 2nd Group Stage|| Zhengzhou, China || Decision (Unanimous)|| 3 || 3:00

|-  style="text-align:center; background:#cfc;"
| 2019-06-03 || Win||align=left| Mohammad Firouzabadi || KO Masters 3 || Bucharest, Romania || KO (Left Hook)|| 2 || 2:05

|-  style="text-align:center; background:#cfc;"
| 2019-03-31 || Win||align=left| Sergio Vinto || Supreme Night Fight || Dej, Romania || Decision (Unanimous)|| 3 ||3:00

|-  style="text-align:center; background:#cfc;"
| 2018-10-28|| Win||align=left| Dmitrii Sirbu || Colosseum Tournament IX || Romania || Decision (Unanimous) || 3 || 3:00

|-  style="text-align:center; background:#cfc;"
| 2018-08-24|| Win||align=left| Jin Ying || Wu Lin Feng 2018: WLF x OSS Fighters - China vs Romania || Mamaia, Romania || Decision (Unanimous) || 3 || 3:00

|-  style="text-align:center; background:#fbb;"
| 2018-06-02 ||Loss|| align="left" | Zhang Chenglong || Glory 54: Birmingham || Birmingham, England || Decision (Unanimous) || 3 ||3:00

|-  style="text-align:center; background:#cfc;"
| 2018-04-28 || Win||align=left| Ali Uzeir || GFC 4 || Varna, Bulgaria || Decision || 3 || 3:00

|-  style="text-align:center; background:#cfc;"
| 2018-04-07 || Win||align=left| Wang Pengfei || Wu Lin Feng 2018: World Championship Shijiazhuang || Shijiazhuang, China || Ext.R Decision  || 4 || 3:00

|-  style="text-align:center; background:#cfc;"
| 2018-01-27 || Win||align=left| Samuele De Mais || Fighters League 2 || Reșița, Romania || Decision || 3 || 3:00

|- style="text-align:center; background:#cfc;"
| 2017-11-04 || Win||align=left| Jin Ying || Wu Lin Feng 2017: Yi Long VS Sitthichai || Kunming, China || Ext.R Decision  || 4 || 3:00

|-  style="text-align:center; background:#fbb;"
| 2017-08-25 || Loss ||align=left| Victor Pinto || Glory 44: Chicago Featherweight Contender Tournament, Semi-Final || Chicago, United States ||Decision (Split) || 3 || 3:00

|- style="text-align:center; background:#cfc;"
| 2017-06-16 || Win ||align=left| Liu Qilliang || Wu Lin Feng 2017: Romania VS China || Timișoara, Romania || Decision (Unanimous) || 3 || 3:00

|- style="text-align:center; background:#cfc;"
| 2017-04-01 || Win ||align=left| Liu Yong || Wu Lin Feng 2017: China VS Europe || Zhengzhou, China || Decision (Unanimous) || 3 || 3:00

|- style="text-align:center; background:#fbb;"
| 2017-03-10 || Loss ||align=left| Bailey Sugden  || Road to Glory UK: 65 kg Tournament, Semi Final|| Grantham, England || Decision (Majority) || 3 || 3:00

|- style="text-align:center; background:#cfc;"
| 2017-03-10 || Win ||align=left| Matteo de Rosa  || Road to Glory UK: 65 kg Tournament, Quarter Final|| Grantham, England || Decision (Unanimous) || 3 || 3:00

|- style="text-align:center; background:#fbb;"
| 2017-02-04 || Loss ||align=left| Chris Shaw || DUEL GRAND PRIX, Semi Final || England || Decision (Unanimous) || 3 || 3:00

|- style="text-align:center; background:#cfc;"
| 2017-01-14 || Win ||align=left| Zhao Fuxiang || Wu Lin Feng World Championship 2017 63 kg Tournament Final|| Zhengzhou, China || TKO || 1 || 
|-
! style=background:white colspan=9 |

|- style="text-align:center; background:#cfc;"
| 2017-01-14 || Win ||align=left| Jin Ying || Wu Lin Feng World Championship 2017 63 kg Tournament Semi Finals|| Zhengzhou, China || Decision (Unanimous) || 3 || 3:00

|- style="text-align:center; background:#cfc;"
| 2017-01-14 || Win ||align=left| Wang Zhiwei || Wu Lin Feng World Championship 2017 63 kg Tournament Quarter Finals|| Zhengzhou, China || Decision (Unanimous) || 3 || 3:00

|-  style="text-align:center; background:#fbb;"
| 2016-12-17 || Loss ||align=left| Qiu Jianliang || Glory of Heroes - Rise 5  || Nanning, China || Decision (Unanimous) || 3 || 3:00

|- style="text-align:center; background:#fbb;"
| 2016-11-19 || Loss ||align=left| Kevin Burmester || Get in the Ring 2016 || Hamburg, Germany || Decision || 3 || 3:00

|- style="text-align:center; background:#cfc;"
| 2016-09-09 || Win ||align=left| Cezar Andrieş || Respect World Series Pitesti || Pitești, Romania || Decision || 3 || 3:00

|- style="text-align:center; background:#cfc;"
| 2016-06-04 || Win ||align=left| Liang Shoutao || Wu Lin Feng: Japan vs China || Zhengzhou, China || Decision (Unanimous) || 3 || 3:00

|-  style="text-align:center; background:#cfc;"
| 2016-04-05|| Win || align=left| Avelino Molina|| WFT Sevilla || Sevilla, Spain || TKO (Low Kicks)|| 2 ||

|-  style="text-align:center; background:#fbb;"
| 2015-10-30|| Loss || align=left| Emad Kadyear || WFT Madrid || Madrid, Spain || Decision || 3 || 3:00

|-  style="text-align:center; background:#cfc;"
| 2015-10-02|| Win || align=left| Roberto Gheorghita || WFT Madrid || Milan, Italy || Decision (Uannimous)|| 3 || 3:00

|-  style="text-align:center; background:#cfc;"
| 2015-08-01|| Win || align=left| Alexandru Șerban || SUPERKOMBAT World Grand Prix IV 2015 || Mamaia, Romania || Decision || 3 || 3:00

|-  style="text-align:center; background:#fbb;"
| 2015-04-25|| Loss || align=left| Cristian Spetcu|| Confruntarea Titanilor || Bucharest, Romania || Ext.R Decision || 4 || 3:00

|-  style="text-align:center; background:#cfc;"
| 2014-12-06 || Win ||align=left| Marius Groß || Muskel Kater Fight Nights || Saulheim, Germany || KO (High kick)|| 2 ||

|-  style="text-align:center; background:#fbb;"
| 2014-09-06 || Loss ||align=left| David Mejia || Fight Dreams || Albacete Spain || Decision || 3 || 3:00

|-  style="text-align:center; background:#cfc;"
| 2014-03-29 || Win ||align=left| Aleksandar Topic || SuperKombat New Heroes || Ploieşti, Romania || Decision (Unanimous) || 3 || 3:00

|-  style="text-align:center; background:#fbb;"
| 2013-11-15 || Loss ||align=left| Sebastian Dragan || UFT - Ultimate Fighting Tournament || Cluj-Napoca, Romania || TKO (leg injury)|| 1 ||

|-  style="text-align:center; background:#cfc;"
| 2013-10-05 || Win ||align=left| Ciprian Botezat || Noaptea Catanelor Negre || Nasaud, Romania || TKO (Corner stoppage)|| 2 ||

|-  style="background:#fbb;"
| 2013-05-05 || Loss ||align=left| Athanasios Karousos  || Scorpion 4 || Greece || Decision || 3 || 3:00 
|-

|-  style="text-align:center; background:#cfc;"
| 2013-04-06 || Win ||align=left| Marius Ciucala || Superkombat || Oradea, Romania || Decision (Unanimous)|| 3 || 3:00

|-  style="text-align:center; background:#fbb;"
| 2011-11-04 || Loss ||align=left| Anis Kaabouri || Romanian Fighting Series 2 || Slobozia, Romania || Decision  || 3 || 3:00

|-  style="text-align:center; background:#cfc;"
| 2011-09-03 || Win||align=left| Nicolae Hristea || Rieni Challenge Fight || Rieni, Romania || TKO (retirement)|| 2 || 3:00

|-  style="background:#fbb;"
| 2010-12-23 || Loss ||align=left| Alexandru Niţă || Bloody Mary Fight Night || Râmnicu Vâlcea, Romania || Decision || 3 || 3:00 
|-
| colspan=9 | Legend:

External links
 Official Glory profile
 Dynamite Fighting Show profile
 Tapology profile

References 

1988 births
Living people
Romanian male kickboxers
SUPERKOMBAT kickboxers
Glory kickboxers